Batocera enganensis is a species of beetle in the family Cerambycidae. It was described by Gahan in 1907. It is known from Sumatra.

References

Batocerini
Beetles described in 1907